

Programme

Best Drama Series

Best Documentary

Best Factual Series or Strand

Best International Programme

Best Single Drama

Performance in Television

Best Actor

Best Actress

Best Male Comedy Performance

Best Supporting Actor

Best Supporting Actress

Performance in a Motion Picture

Best Actor in a Supporting Role

Crafts

Breakthrough Talent

Best Costume Design

Best Director: Factual

Best Director: Fiction

Best Editing: Factual

Best Editing: Fiction

Best Make Up and Hair Design

Best Original Music

Best Photography: Factual

Best Photography and Lightning: Fiction

Best Production Design

Best Scripted Casting

Best Sound: Factual

Best Sound: Fiction

Best Special, Visual, and Graphic Effects

Best Titles and Graphic Identity

Best Writer: Drama

See also
 List of accolades received by Netflix

Others
 List of TCA Awards received by Netflix
 List of Golden Globe Awards received by Netflix
 List of Critics' Choice Awards received by Netflix
 List of Daytime Emmy Awards received by Netflix
 List of Primetime Emmy Awards received by Netflix
 List of Screen Actors Guild Awards received by Netflix
 List of Primetime Creative Arts Emmy Awards received by Netflix

References

Lists of accolades received by Netflix
Lists of television series by network